Phyllis Yes (born 1941) is an Oregon-based artist and playwright. Her artistic media range from works on painted canvas to furniture, clothing, and jewelry. She is known for her works that “feminize” objects usually associated with a stereotypically male domain, such as machine guns, hard hats, and hammers. Among her best-known artworks are “Paint Can with Brush,” which appears in Tools as Art, a book about the Hechinger Collection, published in 1996 and her epaulette jewelry, which applies “feminine” lace details to the epaulette, a shoulder adornment that traditionally symbolizes military prowess. In 1984 she produced her controversial and widely noted “Por She,” a silver 1967 Porsche 911-S, whose body she painstakingly painted in highly tactile pink and flesh-toned lace rosettes. She exhibited it at the Bernice Steinbaum Gallery in New York in 1984 and drove it across the United States as a traveling exhibition in 1985. In 2016, she wrote her first play, Good Morning Miss America, which began its first theatrical run at CoHo Theatre in Portland, Oregon in March 2018.

Key influences 
Phyllis Yes’s interest in socially prescribed gender roles dates to her youth, when she realized that her elderly neighbor was helpless to care for himself after his wife died. She noted, “He didn’t know how to use the dishwasher, the can opener...If it had been the wife who had survived, she probably wouldn’t have known how to find the fuse box.” In her mid-20s, when she was a U.S. Peace Corps volunteer teaching art in northeastern Brazil, she encountered Brazilian gender roles that were different from those she grew up with, such as women who smoked pipes and men who sold fabrics. The experience heightened her awareness that cultures vary widely in their perceptions of “feminine” and “masculine” traits and artifacts. Yes’s key artistic influences include the sculptor Louise Nevelson, as well as feminist artists Judy Chicago and Miriam Schapiro, who urged other women artists “to discover personal imagery and imagery that might honor the neglected and unfairly denigrated women’s decorative and domestic arts of the past.” This impulse influenced Yes’s “highly praised” paintings of lace in the 1970s and 1980s.

Early life 
Phyllis Yes was born in Red Wing, Minnesota, in 1941 and grew up in Austin, Minnesota. She earned a B.A. in art from Luther College in Decorah, Iowa. She earned an M.A. in art from the University of Minnesota and a Ph.D. in art from the University of Oregon in 1978. Upon earning her Ph.D. she dropped her former husband’s surname and replaced it with “Yes” so that she might be addressed as “Dr. Yes.”

Career 
Phyllis Yes taught art at Federal University of Ceara, Brazil, the Oregon College of Education (now Western Oregon University) in Monmouth, Oregon, and Oregon State University in Corvallis, Oregon, before becoming a professor of art at Lewis & Clark College in Portland, Oregon, in 1978. In 1987 she traveled to Bali and New Guinea on a National Endowment for the Arts grant to study gender-related art forms. She served as Chair of the Art Department and Dean of Arts & Humanities at Lewis & Clark College and became a professor emerita of art, painting, and drawing in 1998. Her work has appeared in more than 130 exhibitions. In 2016, at age 75, she wrote her first play, Good Morning Miss America, which had its theatrical debut in Portland, Oregon in 2018. She lives in Portland, Oregon.

Accomplishments 
Associate Professor of art, Lewis and Clark College
Name On Portland Walk of Heroines 
Selected for Art in the Embassies Programme.
First play, Good Morning, Miss America, produced in Portland, Oregon. Of the subject matter, how families care for aging elders, one critic observed, "The play navigates this terrain masterfully."

Awards and honors

Publications 
 "History of Lace," Art & Antiques, December 1987, by Phyllis Yes
 "Mike Walsh at Keller Gallery," article, Artweek, May 1978

Selected exhibitions

Notable collections 
 Binney & Smith Company (now Crayola), Corporate Collection, Easton, Pennsylvania
Jordan Schnitzer Museum of Art, Eugene, Oregon
Levi Strauss & Co., San Francisco, California
Microsoft Gallery, Microsoft Corporation, Redmond, Washington
Museum of Modern Art Lending Service, New York, New York
Portland Art Museum Lending Collection, Portland, Oregon
Portland State University, Professional Building, Portland, Oregon
Security Pacific National Bank, Los Angeles, California
United States Embassy, Addis Ababa, Ethiopia
University of Oregon School of Architecture and Allied Arts, Eugene, Oregon
University of Washington Medical Center, Seattle, Washington
Whitworth University, Spokane, Washington

Further reading 
 Brunsman, Laura and Ruth Askey, Modernism and Beyond: Women Artists of the Pacific Northwest, Midmarch Arts Press, 1993
 Hamill, Pete, Tools as Art: The Hechinger Collection, Abrams Publishing, 1995
 Munro, Eleanor, Originals: American Women Artists, Simon & Schuster, 1979
 Williams, Arthur, Sculpture: Technique-Form-Content, Davis Publishing Co., 1989
 Yes, Phyllis, “Fabric of Society,” Art & Antiques, December 1987

References 

1941 births
American contemporary artists
Feminist artists
Artists from Oregon
Lewis & Clark College faculty
Western Oregon University faculty
People from Red Wing, Minnesota
Living people